

The Goair Trainer is an Australian single-engined, two-seat, training or touring cabin monoplane designed and built by Goair Products at Bankstown Airport in Sydney, Australia.

Design and development
The Trainer is a low-wing monoplane, first flown in July 1995 and powered by a 118 hp (88 kW) Lycoming O-235 piston engine driving a two-bladed propeller. It has a fixed tricycle landing gear and an enclosed cockpit for two in side-by-side configuration with a sliding canopy for access.

Flight testing was completed in November 1998; following this a second substantially-modified aircraft was built as the GoAir GT-1 Trainer, using the engine and instruments from the first aircraft. Changes included a wider fuselage and different ailerons and flaps; the GT-1 was eventually developed into the Brumby Aircraft Brumby 600.

Specifications

References

Notes

Bibliography

 
 
 

1990s Australian civil utility aircraft